Olita is a Latvian feminine given name. The associated name day is November 28.

Notable people named Olita
Olita Rause (born 1962), Latvian chess grandmaster

References 

Latvian feminine given names
Feminine given names